Evanston is a city in and the county seat of Uinta County, Wyoming, United States. The population was 11,747 at the 2020 census. It is located near the border with Utah.

History
Evanston was named after James A. Evans, a civil engineer for the Union Pacific Railroad. Another source maintains it is named for John Evans, second Governor of the Territory of Colorado. The town was founded during the construction of the First transcontinental railroad.  The railroad arrived in the area in November 1868, and Harvey Booth opened a saloon/restaurant in a tent near what is now Front Street.  By December the rails had reached Evanston and the first train arrived December 16. However, orders were later handed down by the railroad managers to move the end of the line 12 miles west, to Wasatch. Within three days, most all of Evanston had moved to Wasatch. It appeared that Evanston would become another "end of the tracks" town. In June 1869 headquarters returned to Evanston and it continued to grow. Later in 1871, a machine shop and roundhouse were constructed, giving Evanston a longevity not shared by many other railroad towns.

Abundant timber and water along the Bear River made Evanston a refueling station for cross-country locomotives. Coal was mined in Almy, a few miles north of Evanston. Similar to other railroad towns in Wyoming, early Evanston had a large population of Chinese railroad workers – in Evanston they lived on the north side of the railroad tracks in a small "China town." Over time, the Chinese population dwindled; the last two members of the first generation of immigrants died in the 1930s.

Evanston was a major stop on the Lincoln Highway. The highway ran east to west from East Service Rd to Bear River Dr, on Front St to Harrison Dr, to Wasatch Rd southwest to Echo Canyon in Utah. It can still be seen along Interstate 80, which follows the railroad tracks in this area.

Evanston underwent massive growth and change during an oil boom in the 1980s. Recent drilling for natural gas has also revitalized the economy of the area. Union Tank Car works on railroad tank cars near the Union Pacific Railroad Complex, locally referred to as the old roundhouse. There are restored railroad buildings, including a roundhouse, in the downtown area.  One of the more recent restorations include 1011 Front Street where Michael's Bar & Grill currently stands. This restaurant is the oldest Bar & Grill in Evanston and once served as a store house for one of the first JCPenney stores in the country. This building, located in historic downtown Evanston, is across the street from the museum in Depot Square. Another restoration project included the rebuilding of the Joss House in Depot Square in 1990; the original had been destroyed in a fire in 1922.

Geography
Evanston is located at  (41.263302, −110.964616). The elevation is 6749 feet (2057 m) above sea level.

Interstate 80/US-189 and State Routes 89 and 150 serve the city.

Evanston has a continental climate (Köppen climate classification Dfb) with long, cold, dry winters and short, warm, slightly more humid summers.

Demographics

2010 census
As of the census of 2010, there were 12,359 people, 4,540 households, and 3,135 families living in the city. The racial makeup of the city was 89.8% White, 0.3% African American, 1.0% Native American, 0.3% Asian, 0.2% Pacific Islander, 5.9% from other races, and 2.5% from two or more races. Hispanic or Latino of any race were 12.3% of the population.

There were 4,540 households, of which 39.9% had children under the age of 18 living with them, 51.8% were married couples living together, 12.0% had a female householder with no husband present, 5.2% had a male householder with no wife present, and 30.9% were non-families. 25.5% of all households were made up of individuals, and 7% had someone living alone who was 65 years of age or older. The average household size was 2.67 and the average family size was 3.21.

The median age in the city was 32.7 years. 30% of residents were under the age of 18; 8.5% were between the ages of 18 and 24; 27.3% were from 25 to 44; 25.7% were from 45 to 64; and 8.6% were 65 years of age or older. The gender makeup of the city was 50.0% male and 50.0% female.

2000 census
As of the census of 2000, there were 11,507 people, 4,058 households, and 2,937 families living in the city. The population density was 1,123.2 people per square mile (433.9/km2). There were 4,665 housing units at an average density of 455.4 per square mile (175.9/km2). The racial makeup of the city was 92.29% Euro American, 0.16% African American, 1.06% Native American, 0.40% Asian, 0.08% Pacific Islander, 4.15% from other races, and 1.87% from two or more races. Hispanic or Latino of any race were 7.29% of the population.

There were 4,058 households, out of which 44.8% had children under the age of 18 living with them, 56.3% were married couples living together, 11.7% had a female householder with no husband present, and 27.6% were non-families. 23.4% of all households were made up of individuals, and 6.0% had someone living alone who was 65 years of age or older. The average household size was 2.77 and the average family size was 3.30.

In the city, the population was spread out, with 33.4% under the age of 18, 9.4% from 18 to 24, 30.1% from 25 to 44, 20.0% from 45 to 64, and 7.2% who were 65 years of age or older. The median age was 31 years. For every 100 females, there were 101.2 males. For every 100 females age 18 and over, there were 97.4 males.

The median income for a household in the city was $42,019, and the median income for a family was $47,220. Males had a median income of $35,843 versus $21,710 for females. The per capita income for the city was $16,725. About 9.1% of families and 11.7% of the population were below the poverty line, including 14.5% of those under age 18 and 5.4% of those age 65 or over.

Religion
The town's religious adherents are:
LDS – 68.4%
Catholic – 15.0%
Southern Baptist – 6.5%
Other Protestant – 8.6%
Other – 1.4%

Government and infrastructure
The Wyoming Department of Health Wyoming State Hospital, a psychiatric facility, is located in Evanston. The facility was operated by the Wyoming Board of Charities and Reform until that agency was dissolved as a result of a state constitutional amendment passed in November 1990.

The United States Postal Service operates the Evanston Post Office.

Education
Public education in the city of Evanston is provided by Uinta County School District #1. The district operates a total of eight campuses, including four elementary schools (Aspen, Clark, North, and Uinta Meadows) serving grades kindergarten through five, two middle schools (Davis and Evanston) serving grades six through eight, one high school (Evanston) serving grades nine through twelve, and one secondary alternative school (Horizon). There is also a BOCES community college there as a branch of the Western Wyoming Community College in the city.

Evanston has a public library, a branch of the Uinta County Library System.

Notable people
 Jaycee Carroll (born 1983), basketball player
 Clarence D. Clark (1851–1930), United States Representative and United States Senator from Wyoming; resident of Evanston
 Mark Hopkinson (1949–1992), convicted murderer executed in 1992; born in Evanston
 Dana Perino (born 1972), White House Press Secretary, 2007–2009; born in Evanston
 Brady Poppinga (born 1979), former NFL linebacker
 Kelly Poppinga (born 1982), former NFL linebacker; current linebackers coach at the University of Virginia
 Winston Watts (born 1967), Jamaican bobsledder; resident of Evanston since 2004; four-time Olympian, representing Jamaica in bobsledding at the 1994, 1998, 2002 and 2014 Winter Olympic Games; team captain and pilot for the Jamaican bobsled team in 2002 and 2014

References

External links

 
 

 
Cities in Wyoming
Cities in Uinta County, Wyoming
County seats in Wyoming
Populated places established in 1868